The  Asian Men's Volleyball Championship was the sixteenth staging of the Asian Men's Volleyball Championship, a biennial international volleyball tournament organised by the Asian Volleyball Confederation (AVC) with Islamic Republic of Iran Volleyball Federation (IRIVF). The tournament was held in Tehran, Iran from 21 to 29 September 2011.

Venues

Pools composition
The teams are seeded by addition of ranking of 2009 Asian Men's Volleyball Championship and FIVB World Rankings divided by 2.

Preliminary round

Pool A

|}

|}

Pool B

|}

|}

Pool C

|}

|}

Pool D

|}

|}

Classification round
 The results and the points of the matches between the same teams that were already played during the preliminary round shall be taken into account for the classification round.

Pool E

|}

|}

Pool F

|}

|}

Pool G

|}

|}

Pool H

|}

|}

Classification 13th–16th

Semifinals

|}

15th place

|}

13th place

|}

Classification 9th–12th

Semifinals

|}

11th place

|}

9th place

|}

Final round

Quarterfinals

 

|}

5th–8th semifinals

|}

Semifinals

|}

7th place

|}

5th place

|}

3rd place

|}

Final

|}

Final standing

Awards
MVP:  Arash Kamalvand
Best Scorer:  Jeon Kwang-in
Best Spiker:  Nathan Roberts
Best Blocker:  Liang Chunlong
Best Server:  Kim Yo-han
Best Setter:  Amir Hosseini
Best Libero:  Farhad Zarif

References

External links
 16th Asian Sr. Men's Volleyball Championship

A
Asian men's volleyball championships
V
V